Bousso is a city in Chari-Baguirmi Region, Chad. The town is served by Bousso Airport.

Demographics

References

Chari-Baguirmi Region
Populated places in Chad